These are the results for the  boys' singles event at the 2018 Summer Youth Olympics.

Results

Ranking round

Elimination rounds

Finals

Top half

Section 1

Section 2

Bottom half

Section 3

Section 4

References

External links
Ranking Round Results
Elimination Rounds Brackets 
Final Rounds Brackets 

Archery at the 2018 Summer Youth Olympics